Ljusdals IF is a sports club in Ljusdal, Sweden, currently only playing soccer.

History
The club was founded on 9 June 1904 and originally competed in soccer, track and field athletics, gymnastics and cross-country skiing. The club has also competed in bandy, ski jumping, handball, ice hockey, orienteering and swimming.

The men's soccer team made it to the Norrland Championship final game in 1950, losing 0–4 to Skellefteå AIK. The team also played four seasons in the Swedish top division between 1968–1971.

Ljusdals IF currently plays in Division 4 Hälsingland which is the sixth tier of Swedish football. They play their home matches at the Älvvallen in Ljusdal.

In 2017 the women's soccer team won Division 1 Northern Svealand. In October 2017, Ljusdals IF defeated Notvikens IK in the qualifying games and
qualified for Elitettan 2018.

The club is affiliated to Hälsinglands Fotbollförbund.

Season to season

In their most successful period Ljusdals IF competed in the following divisions:

In recent seasons Ljusdals IF have competed in the following divisions:

Footnotes

External links
 Ljusdals IF – Official website
 Ljusdals IF on Facebook

Sport in Gävleborg County
Football clubs in Gävleborg County
1904 establishments in Sweden
Defunct bandy clubs in Sweden
Defunct ice hockey teams in Sweden